Year 6 is an educational year group in schools in many countries including the United Kingdom, Australia and New Zealand. It is usually the sixth year of compulsory education and incorporates students aged between ten and eleven however some children who are in Year 6 can be considered as grade 4 in some countries but if the child who was born after September 2nd and grade 4, they will be replaced as Year 5.

Australia
In Australia, Year 6 is usually the seventh year of compulsory education. Although there are slight variations between the states, most children in Year Six are aged between eleven and twelve.

New Zealand
In New Zealand, Year 6 is the sixth year of compulsory education. Children entering this year group are generally aged between 9.5 and 11.
 Year 6 pupils are usually educated in primary schools or in area schools. For contributing primary schools, this is the last year, with students moving onto intermediate schools or combined intermediate and secondary schools, while full primary schools continue to Year 8.

United Kingdom

England
In schools in England Year 6 is the sixth year after Reception. It is the sixth full year of compulsory education, with children being admitted who are aged 10 before 1 September in any given academic year. It is also the final year of Key Stage 2 in which the National Curriculum is taught. It is also the year in which all students in maintained schools undertake National Curriculum tests (known as SATs) in the core subjects of English and Mathematics.

Year 6 is usually the final year of Primary or Junior School. In some areas of England, Year 6 is a year group in Middle school, which covers the year 5–8 or 4–7-year groups.

In some parts of England, where there remain separate Grammar and Secondary modern schools, students in Year 6 may sit a test for entrance into a Grammar school. The test is known colloquially as the Eleven plus exam.

Wales
In schools in Wales Year 6 is the sixth year after Reception. It is currently the sixth full year of compulsory education, with children being admitted who are aged 10 before 1 September in any given academic year. It is the final year group in Key Stage 2.

Northern Ireland and Scotland

In Northern Ireland and Scotland, the sixth year of compulsory education is called Primary 6, and pupils generally start at the age of 9 or 10.

References

6